Waldo is the surname of:

 Clarence Abiathar Waldo (1852–1926), American mathematician, author, and educator
 Daniel Waldo (1762–1864), veteran of the American Revolutionary War,  missionary and U.S. House clergyman
 Daniel Waldo (Oregon pioneer) (1800–1880), American legislator in the Provisional Government of Oregon
 Dr. Dwight B. Waldo (1864–1939), first president of Western Michigan University
 Dwight Waldo (1913–2000), American political scientist
 Edward Hamilton Waldo, birth name of American science fiction author Theodore Sturgeon (1918–1985)
 George E. Waldo (1851–1842), American politician
 Janet Waldo (1920–2016), American actress and voice artist
 Jim Waldo, computer scientist and software architect
 John B. Waldo (1844–1907), jurist and conservationist in Oregon, United States
 Katita Waldo (born 1968), Spanish ballet dancer and ballet master
 Octavia Waldo (born 1929), American writer
 Peter Waldo (1140–1218), founder of a Christian sect called the Waldensians
 Rhinelander Waldo (1877–1927), former U.S. Army captain, Fire and later Police Commissioner of New York City
 Samuel Waldo (merchant) (1696–1759), Massachusetts land speculator, soldier and political figure
 Samuel Lovett Waldo (1783–1861), American painter
 William Waldo (California politician) (1812–1881)
 William Waldo (Oregon politician) (1832–1911)

Fictional characters
 Mr Waldo is a main character in Dylan Thomas's play Under Milk Wood